is a Japanese professional golfer.

Kobayashi has played on the Japan Golf Tour since 1999. He won his first title in 2011 at the Totoumi Hamamatsu Open and his second at the Asia-Pacific Panasonic Open in 2012. He also won two events on the Japan Challenge Tour in 2000.

Professional wins (6)

Japan Golf Tour wins (3)

1Co-sanctioned by the Asian Tour
 The Japan Open Golf Championship is also a Japan major championship.

Japan Golf Tour playoff record (1–0)

Japan Challenge Tour wins (3)

*Note: The 2022 ISPS Handa Hero ni nare! Challenge Tournament was shortened to 36 holes due to weather.

Results in major championships

CUT = missed the half-way cut
"T" = tied

Results in World Golf Championships

WD = withdrew

References

External links

Japanese male golfers
Japan Golf Tour golfers
Sportspeople from Chiba Prefecture
1976 births
Living people